Dorf Goes Auto Racing is a 1990 comedy short film starring Tim Conway, Eddie Deezen and Tim Conway Jr.

Plot
World-famous European race car driver, Duessel Dorf (a pun on the German city of a similar name), comes to America to take on his greatest challenge-stock car racing at Sears Point Raceway, where the racers of NASCAR react with disgust at his arrival. With a thoroughly incompetent pit crew,  Dorf will have to rely on his knack for inadvertently creating chaos to win the race.

This was the last appearance in the series for Boom-Boom LaRue (Michele Smith); she had appeared in all four films to date.

An unfortunate plot line involves a beautiful love interest named Gwendolyn.

“There’s a little bit of Dorf in all of us. But there’s a little more in Gwendolyn.”

External links 
 

Dorf Goes Auto Racing
Auto Racing
Dorf Goes Auto Racing
1990s sports comedy films
1990 comedy films
1990s English-language films
1990s American films